The Island Beskids (in Polish, Beskid Wyspowy) is a mountain range in southern Poland, part of the Western Beskids of the Outer Western Carpathians, with significant natural resources, folk culture, medieval history, and developing resources for tourism.

The distinctive feature of this region is its isolated, individual peaks, from which derives its name.  The highest peak is Mogielica (1170 meters).  Other major peaks include Ćwilin (1072 meters), Jasien (1052 meters), Modyń (1029 meters), Luboń Wielki (1022 meters), and Krzystonów (1012 meters).

Natural reserves in the range include:

 Białowodzka Mountain Nature Reserve
 Kamionna Nature Reserve
 Kostrza Nature Reserve
 Luboń Wielki Nature Reserve 
 Mogielica Nature Reserve (established March 12, 2011)
 Śnieżnica Nature Reserve

Villages in the range include Szczyrzyc.

References

Mountain ranges of Poland
Mountain ranges of the Western Carpathians